HMS Berwick was a 70-gun third rate ship of the line of the Royal Navy, built by Richard Stacey at Deptford Dockyard and launched on 23 July 1723.

She was part of the Blockade of Porto Bello in 1727.

In 1739/40 she was under command of Captain Isaac Townsend.

Berwick was converted to a hulk in 1743, and eventually broken up in 1763.

Notes

References

Lavery, Brian (2003) The Ship of the Line - Volume 1: The development of the battlefleet 1650-1850. Conway Maritime Press. .

Ships of the line of the Royal Navy
1720s ships